Elena Sidneva (born 31 December 1964) is a Russian dressage rider. She is a two-time Olympian. Her best Olympic result came in 2000 when she placed 24th in the individual dressage competition.

She received a wild card for the 2014 Dressage World Cup Final in Lyon after Denmark's Lars Petersen withdrew. At the final held in Lyon's Euroexpo she finished 13th. She also competed at the following World Cup final in 2015 held in Las Vegas, Nevada where she finished 17th.

References

Living people
1964 births
Russian dressage riders
Olympic equestrians of Russia
Russian female equestrians
Equestrians at the 2000 Summer Olympics
Equestrians at the 2004 Summer Olympics